Erica canaliculata, the channelled heath or hairy grey heather, is a species of flowering plant in the family Ericaceae. The species is  native to the East and West Capes of South Africa and naturalised in South Australia. It is an erect evergreen shrub, sometimes described as a tree heath (a term also applied to E. arborea and E. lusitanica).

The Latin specific epithet canaliculata means “with channeled or grooved leaves”.

Not fully hardy, in frost-prone areas it requires some protection. It has gained the Royal Horticultural Society's Award of Garden Merit.

References

canaliculata
Flora of the Cape Provinces
Taxa named by Henry Cranke Andrews